On 6 June 1967 the Suez Canal was closed shortly after the start of the Six-Day War or Third Arab–Israeli War. Israel bombed most of Egypt's airfields and then entered and occupied the Sinai Peninsula, all the way to the Suez Canal, for 15 years. Gamal Abdel Nasser, the leader of Egypt at the time, was aligning himself with the Soviet Union and had the Suez Canal closed earlier from October 1956 until March 1957 during the Suez Crisis, when he nationalized the Suez Canal from French and British investors. Oil through the Suez Canal accounted for 60% of Italy's, 39% of France's, and 25% of Britain's total oil consumption in 1966 before the canal was closed for 8 years. The canal opened again in June 1975 after the 1974 Suez Canal Clearance Operation of mines and debris.

Oil embargo

In October 1973 the Yom Kippur War started when Egypt crossed the Suez Canal in Operation Badr that ended in a failed attempt to take back the Sinai Peninsula from Israel. That resulted in OAPEC countries cutting production of oil and placing an embargo on oil exports to the United States and other countries backing Israel, when Richard Nixon requested $2.2 billion to support Israel in the Yom Kippur War on 19 October 1973. The embargo only lasted a few months until January 1974, but the price of oil remained high even after the embargo was lifted.

See also
 Closure of the Suez Canal (1956–1957)
 1974 Suez Canal Clearance Operation, a US-led operation to clear the canal of naval mines and wrecked ships after its closure in the Six-Day War
 1970s commodities boom
 Yellow Fleet, a group of fifteen ships trapped in the canal from 1967 to 1975 as a result of the Six-Day War
 Railway to Eilat – proposed railway in Israel that might act as a backup in case of another obstruction
 1970s energy crisis
 Yom Kippur War
 Operation Abirey-Halev
 Aswan Dam
 Bar Lev Line
 2021 Suez Canal obstruction
 Israeli passage through the Suez Canal and Straits of Tiran
 Stagflation

References

Suez Canal
1974 in Egypt
Egypt–United States military relations